Mehdi Bennani  (born 25 August 1983) is a Moroccan racing driver who currently competes in the TCR Europe with Sébastien Loeb Racing. He was TCR Europe Champion in 2020 with the Belgian team Comtoyou Racing.

He became the first Moroccan driver to win a world championship race organized by the FIA, after his victory in Shanghai in the WTCC.

Racing career

Early career
Like most racing drivers, Bennani started out in karting, winning his national championship in 2001. He finished as runner-up in the European Karting Championship in the 100 ICA class. He also won the Moroccan Fiat Palio Trophy in 2001. He moved into single-seaters and was runner-up in Formula BMW Asia in 2004. He moved to the Formula Renault 3.5 Series in 2005 with the Avalon Formula team, racing against the likes of Robert Kubica and Will Power. He also competed for EuroInternational in 2006, but failed to score a point in his time in the series. He competed in Euroseries 3000 in 2007, finishing 14th in the final standings and scored a best result of fourth. In 2008, he competed in the Pau Historical Grand Prix, where he finished second.

World Touring Car Championship

Exagon Engineering (2009)

In May 2009, Bennani competed in his home round of the World Touring Car Championship, the Race of Morocco at the Marrakech Street Circuit in a SEAT León 2.0 TFSI prepared by Exagon Engineering. He was backed by OMNT, Morocco's Tourism Office. He became the first North African to race in the WTCC, on the series' first visit to the African continent. He qualified in 14th place for the first race, and finished in 9th place, winner of the Independent's category. He finished ninth in the second race, and impressed throughout the weekend with the way he was able to keep up with WTCC regulars. He competed at four further race weekends for Exagon. At the Race of Portugal, he collided with the stranded car of Alain Menu on the narrow street circuit; he was later disqualified from the final classification.

Wiechers-Sport (2010)
In 2010, Bennani drove a BMW 320si for the Wiechers-Sport team. The season yielded just three points and 20th place in the drivers standings.

Proteam Racing (2011–2014)
Bennani moved to Proteam Racing for 2011 to drive one of their new BMW 320 TCs. His best result of the season was a 6th place in the final race at Macau.

Bennani stayed on at Proteam for 2012. He was joined at the team by Isaac Tutumlu until he left after the Race of Slovakia, reducing the team to one car for Bennani. He took a career best fourth-place finish in race one at the Race of Hungary. He bettered this with his maiden podium finish in race two, finishing in third place. A collision with Stefano D'Aste at the Race of Portugal earned him a suspended grid penalty. He started second for race two of the Race of the United States and inherited the lead from D'Aste halfway around the first lap when D'Aste spun off. He held the lead until lap four when he spun off and damaged his car, forcing him to retire and passing the lead to Franz Engstler. Race one of the Race of Japan saw Aleksei Dudukalo collide with Bennani who then returned to the pits for repairs. For the second race, Bennani held off the Chevrolet trio for much of the race before being passed in the lap two laps. He was caught up in a first corner crash in race one of the Race of Macau in which a number of cars piled into the Lisboa corner on the first lap and blocked the track. Bennani's car was stuck across the track and was lifted out of the way before the race resumed. He finished the season tenth in the drivers' championship tied on points with Alex MacDowall but ranked ahead due to his podium in Hungary.

Bennani stayed with Proteam for the 2013 season, driving their BMW 320 TC for the third consecutive year., Mehdi finished 12th, 4th of the independents. After a difficult season with bad mechanical luck and an unresponsive car, Mehdi eschewed the BMW for a Honda Civic.

In 2014, Bennani scored his first WTCC win at the championship's Shanghai round. Bennani went on to finish the season in 11th place.

Sebastian Loeb Racing (2015–2019)

For 2015, Bennani signed with Sébastien Loeb Racing, switching to a 2014-spec Citroën C-Elysée WTCC for his first season with the team.

2016

For 2016, Bennani had two teammates, Tom Chilton and Gregoire Demoustier.

Racing record

Career summary

Complete Formula Renault 3.5 Series results
(key) (Races in bold indicate pole position) (Races in italics indicate fastest lap)

Complete World Touring Car Championship results
(key) (Races in bold indicate pole position) (Races in italics indicate fastest lap)

† Driver did not finish the race, but was classified as he completed over 90% of the race distance.

Complete World Touring Car Cup results
(key) (Races in bold indicate pole position) (Races in italics indicate fastest lap)

Complete TCR Europe Touring Car Series results
(key) (Races in bold indicate pole position) (Races in italics indicate fastest lap)

References

1983 births
Living people
People from Fez, Morocco
Moroccan racing drivers
Formula BMW Asia drivers
World Series Formula V8 3.5 drivers
European Touring Car Cup drivers
World Touring Car Championship drivers
World Touring Car Cup drivers
EuroInternational drivers
Sébastien Loeb Racing drivers
Citroën Racing drivers
Team Meritus drivers
Formule Campus Renault Elf drivers
Comtoyou Racing drivers
Volkswagen Motorsport drivers
TCR Europe Touring Car Series drivers